Elfriede Amanda Lender (19 May 1882 Tallinn – 10 April 1974 Stockholm) was an Estonian teacher and pedagogue. Lender was the founder of the first Estonian-language girls' school in the Estonia.

Since 1901 she worked as a teacher in Tallinn. In 1907 she established Elfriede Lender Private Gymnasium (:et), where Estonian girls may study. From 1920 until 1927, she studied at the University of Tartu. In 1937 she established a seminary for pre-school educators.

In 1944 she fled to Sweden. From 1945 until 1962, she worked in Stockholm.

Her spouse was an engineer Voldemar Lender.

Works

 Minu lastele (Stockholm, 1967, Tallinn, 2000, 2010)

References

1882 births
1974 deaths
Estonian schoolteachers
University of Tartu alumni
Estonian World War II refugees
Estonian emigrants to Sweden